Gourmya (Gladiocerithium) argutum is a species of sea snail, a marine gastropod mollusk in the family Cerithiidae.

There is one variety : Gourmya (Gladiocerithium) argutum var. argutum (Monterosato, 1911)

The subspecies Gourmya (Gladiocerithium) argutum barashi Nordsieck, 1974 is a synonym of Cerithium scabridum Philippi, 1848

Description

Distribution

References

Cerithiidae
Gastropods described in 1911